The Magok Bridge crosses the Han River in South Korea as a part of the AREX of the Incheon International Airport. A truss bridge, construction began in January 2004 and finished on December 29, 2010.

References

Bridges in Seoul
Buildings and structures in Seoul
Bridges completed in 2010
Bridges over the Han River (Korea)
Railway bridges in South Korea
AREX